WGBW (1590 AM) is a radio station licensed to serve Denmark, Wisconsin, United States, and provides a city-grade signal over Green Bay.  The station is owned by Mark Heller (licensed to WTRW, Inc.) and airs an progressive talk format.

History
The station had been on the air since October 29, 1951, licensed to Two Rivers, Wisconsin and serving the Manitowoc area, most notably under the WTRW call sign.  In September 2006, the station was assigned the WGBW calls by the FCC, part of an effort by station ownership to move the station from the Two Rivers/Manitowoc area to the larger Green Bay radio market.  After 4 years of applications and amendments, the FCC granted WGBW a construction permit in August 2008 to move the station's city of license from Two Rivers to Denmark, Wisconsin, and to increase its daytime and nighttime broadcast power.  On September 14, 2011, WGBW relaunched with its new 10,000 watt day/500 watt night signal from its new transmitter site in Denmark, Wisconsin.

For several years, WGBW has been airing a satellite-fed oldies music format; the station had carried Dial Global's "Kool Gold" service until October 15, 2008, when it moved to Citadel Media's "The True Oldies Channel".  The station also carries top-of-the-hour newscasts from ABC News (it had carried CNN Radio and NBC Radio News newscasts prior to January 2010).  WGBW has also featured broadcasts of Denmark Vikings high school sporting events.

On January 2, 2013, WGBW dropped its oldies format and became a full-time affiliate of ESPN Radio, replacing WDUZ as the Green Bay market's ESPN affiliate.  Though the move meant the loss of its programming on the FM signal WDUZ provided (at 107.5 FM), the move to WGBW gave ESPN Radio live clearance of its full daily sports talk schedule in Green Bay for the first time, including some shows that WDUZ preempted in favor of local talk programming (among them Mike and Mike in the Morning and The Herd with Colin Cowherd).

On April 3, 2013 WGBW switched back to True Oldies and ended their ESPN Radio affiliation, blaming a crowded market in the Green Bay area for sports talk in leaving the format after only three months.  ESPN has yet to re-launch a radio affiliate in the Green Bay market, as of Summer 2017.  Programming of oldies is now done locally.

On September 23, 2022, it was announced that Civic Media would acquire WGBW.

On January 18, 2023, WGBW changed their format from oldies to progressive talk.

References

External links

GBW
Radio stations established in 1951
Denmark, Wisconsin
1951 establishments in Wisconsin